Jeff Lockie (born November 14, 1993) is a former American football quarterback who played college football at Oregon.

Early years
Lockie played high school football at Monte Vista High School in Danville, California, where he was a two-year starter. He threw for 2,449 passing yards and 26 touchdowns while also rushing for 205 yards his junior year. He completed 234 passes for 3,278 passing yards and 31 touchdowns while also rushing for 136 yards and 7 touchdowns his senior season in 2011, earning East Bay Athletic League MVP honors.

College career
Lockie lettered for the Oregon Ducks of the University of Oregon from 2013 to 2016. He was redshirted in 2012. Lockie and Jake Rodrigues shared the backup spot behind Marcus Mariota in 2013. Lockie played in 9 games in 2013, completing 8 of 13 passes for 57 yards and 1 interception while also rushing 5 times for 22 yards and 1 touchdown. He earned Pac-12 All-Academic Honorable Mention honors in 2013. He was the backup to Mariota in 2014. Lockie played in 10 games, completing 21 of 28 passes for 207 yards and 1 touchdown while also rushing 4 times for 10 yards. He was the backup to Vernon Adams in 2015. Lockie played in 6 games, starting 3, completing 61 of 99 passes for 580 yards, 5 touchdowns and 4 interceptions while also rushing 34 times for 92 yards. His three starts were a result of Adams being injured. Lockie garnered CoSIDA Academic All-District and Pac-12 All-Academic First Team recognition in 2015. He did not play in any games in 2016 and was named Oregon's Offensive Scout Team Player of the Year. He played in 25 games, starting 3, during his college career, completing 90 of 140 passes for 844 yards, 6 touchdowns and 5 interceptions while also rushing 43 times for 124 yards and 1 touchdown.

Statistics

Source:

References

External links
College stats

Living people
Place of birth missing (living people)
American football quarterbacks
Oregon Ducks football players
People from Alamo, California
Players of American football from California
Sportspeople from the San Francisco Bay Area
1993 births